Els Callens and Julie Halard-Decugis were the defending champions but did not compete that year.

Janette Husárová and Dominique Van Roost won in the final 6–2, 6–7, 6–3 against Aleksandra Olsza and Elena Pampoulova.

Seeds
Champion seeds are indicated in bold text while text in italics indicates the round in which those seeds were eliminated.

 Rika Hiraki /  Sung-Hee Park (quarterfinals)
 Alexandra Fusai /  Mercedes Paz (semifinals)
 Sonya Jeyaseelan /  Rene Simpson (quarterfinals)
 Laura Golarsa /  Patricia Hy-Boulais (first round)

Draw

External links
 ITF tournament edition details

WTA Auckland Open
1997 WTA Tour